Rodney Combs (born March 27, 1950) is an American former stock car racing driver. He has not been in NASCAR since 1997, when he was released from his ride in the Busch Series. Combs entered NASCAR after many years on the open-wheel and short track circuit in the Midwest, racing with Mark Martin and Dick Trickle. Combs was a 2001 inductee in the National Dirt Late Model Hall of Fame.

Racing career

Winston Cup Series
Combs made his debut in 1982, in the then Winston Cup Series. Driving the #5 for J.D. Stacy, Combs qualified the Stacy-Pak Buick to 28th on the starting position in the fall race at Atlanta, and finished in 9th place, leading five laps.

Combs was invited back by Stacy to drive the #12 Stroh's Buick in the 1983 fall race at Charlotte. Combs started 33rd and appeared to earn another top-ten, but extremely late in the going, Combs' car blew an engine, putting him to 22nd.

The next time Combs showed up was in 1984. This time, Combs was behind the #2 Red Roof Inns Buick owned by Robert Harrington. Combs made it into the August Michigan race with a 19th place qualifying effort. He completed all but eight laps en route to a 25th-place finish.

Combs, who was still doing Midwest racing, disappeared back to those ranks for a year, and then returned with a five-race deal in 1986. Driving Harrington's #2 Solder Seal/Gunk Pontiac, Combs had a best of 16th at Charlotte and a 19th at Talladega, where he led four laps. However, Combs only finished the Charlotte race, falling out of the other four.

Combs drove for a number of teams in 1987, yet still could not crack the top ten. His best run was a 16th at Pocono, although he did have five other top-20s. He ran the majority of the races for Elmo Langley's #64 team, although he did have some runs with DiGard Motorsports and Roger Hamby. Overall, he had 14 starts in 1987, and earned a 35th-place position in points.

Combs ran nineteen races in 1988, the most active year of his career. Seventeen of them were for the #97 ACDelco team, while Combs competed in one race for Ken Allen and another for Richard Childress Racing. Despite all the starts, Combs had a worse year than in 1987, despite matching the 35th in points. His best finish was 11th at Bristol, but he only had one other top-20, a 14th at Michigan. Combs, however, did earn his first career top-10 starting spot, a 9th at Richmond. Combs' biggest issue was 11 DNFs, though to Combs' defense, all but one of them was mechanical.

In 1989, Combs only made nine starts and did not even crack the top-20. His best run was a 23rd at Darlington, driving for Lake Speed. Yet, Combs ran the majority of the races for the #89 Evinrude Pontiac. The best run for that team was a 27th at Phoenix. Combs also had three races in 1989 for Allen.

Combs made his last five career Cup starts in 1990. Combs ran all five races for the #89 team, but could only manage a best of 27th at Phoenix. In addition, Combs only finished two of the races. Overall in his Cup career, Combs had one top-ten finish and one top-10 start.

Busch Series

Combs made his Busch debut in 1982, the same year he made his Cup debut. Driving for J.D. Stacy again, Combs drove the #4 Stacy Pontiac into the Charlotte field with a 7th place starting position. Like he would in his Cup debut, Combs came home with a 9th place showing.

Combs made another one-off start in 1983. Once again, Combs ran at Charlotte, where he qualified a 4th. This time, Combs could not improve on his first finish, but still came home with a 10th-place showing.

Combs disappeared for three years, and was back in 1987, with a four-race deal with the #67 J&J Steel car. His best run once again came at Charlotte, adding another tenth place on. Also noteworthy was a start and finish of 13th at Darlington.

Combs next race came in 1990, driving for Ferree Racing at Charlotte. He started 26th, but finished 37th after his carburetor failed.

Combs finally made his first full season in NASCAR in 1993, driving the #1 Luxaire Ford for the full season, qualifying for all but one race. Combs earned three top-10s in 1993, with a career-best eighth at Milwaukee Mile and back-to-back tenths at Martinsville and Nazareth. Even more to Combs advantage, were a low DNF count of three, an impressive number for someone who is basically a rookie. Most impressive of all, by far, is his lowest finish. His lowest finish of the year was at Darlington, where he finished 26th. This contributed to Combs earning a 15th in points, despite missing one race. Lastly, Combs qualified well too, the best being a triplet of fourth-place starts, of which he converted into a 10th, 12th and 15th-place finish in the race.

With an impressive season with a low-budget team, Combs was hired by Petty Enterprises to drive the #43 Black Flag/French's Pontiac the following year. Despite the famous ride, 1994 was a roller coaster. Combs did not make four of the 27 races, but matched his three top-10s of '93. Combs best runs were a pair of 9th at Martinsville and Myrtle Beach and a 10th at Bristol. Yet, Combs did have seven other top-20s. However, in addition to poor qualifying results with the first year team, Combs' team had 9 DNFs, a tough thing to overcome. (In Combs' defense, all but two were mechanical) This led to a poor 21st place showing in points.

Combs' best career year in any NASCAR series came in 1995, where he finished 11th in points. This year, Combs made all the races, and this enabled him to once again earn three top-10s. Combs earned new career bests of 6th at Myrtle Beach and Atlanta, and tacked on a 10th at Dover International Speedway and a large 16 other top-20s to boot. Along with a lesser DNF count (4), Combs' team looked in good shape for 1996.

However, 1996 was not Combs' best year, and it began to lead to his departure from the sport. Combs made all but one start in 1996, and earned 18th in points, after another up-and-down year. Combs earned a pair of sixths as his only top-10s in 1996 at Daytona and Atlanta. (Combs would later prove to have a career best finish of 6th-four times)
Combs did earn what would prove to be his best career start: a 3rd at Myrtle Beach. However, on the flipside, Combs only earned 9 top-20s, down from 19 in 1995, the primary reason for his points slide.

1997 was the end of Combs' career. Petty Enterprises sold the team to David Ridling. He only made five starts for the team before being released, the best being an 11th-place finish at Atlanta. He was replaced by Dennis Setzer and replaced Setzer in the #78 Mark III Financial Chevy. He ran a best of 20th at Richmond in three races for the team. Yet, after Nashville, Combs disappeared from the team and has not been racing in big-league NASCAR since.

Craftsman Truck Series
When racing for Petty Enterprises in 1995 and 1996, Combs made five starts in 1995 and one in 1996 for in the Truck Series. Combs made his series debut at Milwaukee, qualifying ninth and finishing 10th. Combs then came back at IRP, qualifying 9th and once again coming home with a top-10: this time a solid 4th. Combs made three more starts in 1995, with finishes of 11th, 14th and 16th. Combs also added on one more start in 1996. Driving at North Wilkesboro, Combs managed a career-best 4th place start. However, he came home with a career-worst finish of 20th.

Combs has not raced in NASCAR since.

Motorsports career results

NASCAR
(key) (Bold – Pole position awarded by qualifying time. Italics – Pole position earned by points standings or practice time. * – Most laps led.)

Winston Cup Series

Daytona 500

Busch Series

Craftsman Truck Series

ARCA Permatex SuperCar Series
(key) (Bold – Pole position awarded by qualifying time. Italics – Pole position earned by points standings or practice time. * – Most laps led.)

References

External links
 

Living people
1950 births
Sportspeople from Cincinnati
Racing drivers from Ohio
NASCAR drivers
American Speed Association drivers
Richard Childress Racing drivers